is a retired Nippon Professional Baseball player. He played for the Orix Buffaloes and the Hanshin Tigers.

External links

Japan Baseball Daily

Living people
1978 births
Baseball people from Kumamoto Prefecture
Hanshin Tigers players
Japanese baseball players
Nippon Professional Baseball pitchers
Orix BlueWave players
Orix Buffaloes players
People from Kumamoto